Austin & Ally is an American comedy television series created by Kevin Kopelow and Heath Seifert that aired on Disney Channel from December 2, 2011 to January 10, 2016. The series stars Ross Lynch, Laura Marano, Raini Rodriguez, and Calum Worthy.

Set in Miami, Florida, the series focuses on the relationship between two very different musicians: extroverted and fun-loving singer and instrumentalist Austin Moon and introverted and awkward songwriter Ally Dawson, who is also a singer, but has a bad case of stage fright.

Plot 
In the initial episode, "Rockers & Writers", Austin overhears Ally singing a song she's written.  Later, he changes the tempo of the song and sings it himself, although he's completely forgotten it's the same song he heard Ally singing.  He becomes famous from it after his best friend, Dez, directs Austin in a music video for the song and posts it on the Internet, making Austin an overnight sensation. Once Ally takes credit for her song, she and Austin work together on a second song.  At the end of the episode, Austin convinces her to become his partner, and the two agree to work together and eventually become close friends. Ally's best friend, Trish, pitches in as Austin's manager and Dez continues to direct Austin's music videos. At the end of the first season, Austin gets signed to Jimmy Starr's record label.

The second season sees both Austin and Ally taking bigger steps. Ally conquers her stage fright by performing a duet with Austin. By the end of the second season, Ally signs a record deal and records an album with Ronnie Ramone, while Austin goes on his first national tour. Due to her schedule with Ronnie Ramone, Ally is unable to attend the first half of Austin's tour, but in the first two episodes of the third season, Ally does attend the second half of the tour.

In the third season, Ally's career takes off. Later, Ally is making her first album. By the end of the third season, Austin sacrifices his music career when his record label forbids him from being together with Ally. Austin chooses to be with Ally as they confess their love for each other. In the end, Austin goes with Ally on her first tour, Trish starts her own management company, and Dez goes to film school in Los Angeles.

In the fourth season, the group reunites after the tour and turns Sonic Boom into a music school called A&A Music Factory, where they help students pursue their musical dreams. They combine their talents to become business partners, and the store's success explodes.

The series has been described as a "pint-sized" version of HBO's comedy-drama Entourage.

Episodes

Jessie crossover 
In November 2012, Disney Channel announced that the series would crossover with Jessie as an hour-long special episode titled "Austin & Jessie & Ally All Star New Year". The special aired on December 7, 2012, in which Austin finally gets to perform in Times Square on New Year's Eve like he has always dreamed of, with help from Jessie and the Ross children. Later, Jessie and the children travel to Miami with the group. Jessie inadvertently steals lyrics that were written by Zuri and tries to get Austin to sing them with her. Meanwhile, Ravi is jealous to see that the family's pet lizard, Mrs. Kipling, may have a crush on Dez, though it turns out that Mrs. Kipling does not like Dez at all.

Cast and characters

Main 

After becoming an overnight Internet sensation by performing a song he overheard Ally singing, Ally tracks him down to confront him for theft, but they eventually become friends instead and decide to form a musical partnership. His partnership with Ally is initially built on the idea that "he rocks; she writes". Ally is a brilliant songwriter, but is too timid to perform her own music, while Austin loves to perform, but is unable to write songs for himself. Their radically different personalities tend to clash early on, though they find they're much more alike than they think as their friendship develops, leading to an on-again, off-again romance starting in the second season. In the third season, they begin to date again and are found in a healthy, secure relationship throughout the fourth season. Austin's best friend is Dez, who directs and films all of his music videos, and his manager is Trish. Austin gives music lessons and teaches students about being a performer at the A&A Music Factory in the fourth season. In the series finale, it is revealed that Austin is married to Ally and they have two children named Alex and Ava.
Ally's father ran a music store and that's where Ally learned to love music and write songs. She originally wrote for herself, but after Austin accidentally stole one of her songs and became an Internet sensation as a result, she and her best friend, Trish, track him down, and she eventually becomes his musical partner and songwriter. Her partnership with Austin is initially built on the idea that "she writes; he rocks". Ally is a brilliant songwriter, but is too timid to perform her own music, while Austin loves to perform, but is unable to write songs for himself. Their radically different personalities tend to clash early on, though they find they're much more alike than they think as their friendship develops, leading to an on-again, off-again romance starting in the second season. In the third season, they begin to date again and are found in a healthy, secure relationship throughout the fourth season. Ally works at her father's music store, Sonic Boom, until she manages to conquer her stage fright and begins her own career, at which point the store becomes the A&A Music Factory. She gives music lessons and teaches students about being a performer at the Music Factory in the fourth season. In the series finale, it is revealed that Ally is married to Austin and they have two children named Alex and Ava.
She is sarcastic, snarky, lazy, vindictive, has little patience, and has a bit of a temper, but cares very much for her friends. Her jobs change frequently due to her lack of effort and presence at work. She takes her job as Austin's manager, however, fairly seriously and she also became Ally's manager when her career takes off. She has a complicated love-hate relationship with Dez. She teaches students at the A&A Music Factory about being a celebrity manager in the fourth season.
He films all of Austin's music videos and is Austin's best friend. He's considerably dense and lacks much logical understanding which tends to lead him and the group into messy situations. He has a complicated love-hate relationship with Trish. He teaches students at the A&A Music Factory about filming and directing music videos in the fourth season.

Recurring 
 Cole Sand as Nelson, an awkward young boy who takes music lessons from Ally. He constantly uses the phrase, "Aww, nartz!" and tends to mix up words that sound alike, such as "oboe" and "hobo".
 Andy Milder as Lester Dawson, Ally's cheapskate father who owns the music store Sonic Boom. He is completely ignorant of Ally's musical talents and believes that Ally has a billion-to-one shot at making it in the music business, just like Austin's parents have told him. He and Penny, Ally's mother, are divorced.
 Richard Whiten as Jimmy Starr, the owner of Starr Records who signs Austin to his record label.
 Aubrey Miller as Megan Simms, a 10-year-old reporter and photographer for Cheetah Beat Magazine. Megan is eccentric and constantly uses teenage slang terms such as "totes" or "hilar". She is stubborn and nosy as well, as she is bent on getting the stories she's after for the magazine.
 John Henson as Mike Moon, Austin's father, who co-owns the mattress store Moon's Mattress Kingdom.
 Jill Benjamin as Mimi Moon, Austin's mother, who used to be a hand model before co-owning Moon's Mattress Kingdom.
 Kiersey Clemons as Kira Starr, Jimmy Starr's daughter and Austin's ex-girlfriend. Kira temporarily had a case of repugnant breath, causing the group to be extremely wary of her throughout "Ferris Wheels & Funky Breath". Her bad breath was caused by her constant eating of garlic and anchovy pizza. Her bad breath cleared away afterward.
 John Paul Green as Chuck, a short, country-speaking teenager who believes he is better than Dez at everything. Their rivalry follows a long history of their families feuding, so Chuck and Dez often get into similar battles. He usually wears cowboy attire.
 Ashley Fink as Mindy, the manager of The Melody Diner and has a crush on Dez. Dez himself has no interest in her and is more intimidated by her than anything, as Mindy is overbearing and aggressive.
 Joe Rowley as Ronnie Ramone, the owner of Ramone Records, who signs Ally to his record label.
 Hannah Kat Jones as Carrie, a waitress at Shredder's Beach Club, Piper's sister, and Dez's girlfriend. She broke up with him in Los Angeles, but they got back together in "Wedding Bells & Wacky Birds".
 Hayley Erin as Piper, Carrie's sister and Austin's ex-girlfriend.
 Cameron Deane Stewart as Jace, a boy who Trish met when she was on tour and Trish's long-distance boyfriend.
 Cameron Jebo as Gavin Young, a country performer and Ally's ex-boyfriend.

Production 
The series was created by Kevin Kopelow and Heath Seifert, the writers and producers of the Nickelodeon comedy series All That and the Disney Channel sitcoms Sonny with a Chance and Jonas. Production for the pilot episode began in mid-February 2011, and on May 24, 2011, Disney Channel announced that Austin & Ally had been picked up as a series. They initially ordered 13 episodes, though that number was later increased to 21; however, only 19 aired. The first promo for the series was released in October 2011, during Disney Channel's Make Your Mark: The Ultimate Dance-Off event. The series officially premiered on December 2, 2011. The series was renewed for a second season and resumed production in summer 2012. The second season premiered on October 7, 2012. The series was renewed for a third season by Disney Channel on April 2, 2013. The third season premiered on October 27, 2013, and production ended on January 24, 2014. The series was renewed for a fourth season on April 25, 2014, which premiered on January 18, 2015. On February 6, 2015, Laura Marano stated that the fourth season would be the final season. The final episode aired on January 10, 2016.

Songs

Broadcast 
The series airs worldwide on Disney Channel. It aired as a preview in Canada alongside the original broadcast and premiered on January 20, 2012. It premiered in Singapore on March 3, 2012, and in Australia and New Zealand on March 23, 2012. In India, the series premiered on Disney Channel on December 1, 2013, and on October 30, 2017 on Disney International HD. In the UK and Ireland the series aired a preview on March 30, 2012, and premiered on April 20, 2012. The series premiered on Disney Channel in Canada on September 1, 2015, with Raini Rodriguez and Calum Worthy introducing the series with special contests and events.

Reception

Ratings 
 

| link2             = List of Austin & Ally episodes#Season 2 (2012–13)
| episodes2         = 26
| start2            = 
| end2              = 
| startrating2      = 4.02
| endrating2        = 3.27
| viewers2          = |2}} 

| link3             = List of Austin & Ally episodes#Season 3 (2013–14)
| episodes3         = 21
| start3            = 
| end3              = 
| startrating3      = 3.28
| endrating3        = 2.90
| viewers3          = |2}} 

| link4             = List of Austin & Ally episodes#Season 4 (2015–16)
| episodes4         = 20
| start4            = 
| end4              = 
| startrating4      = 3.08
| endrating4        = 3.20
| viewers4          = |2}} 
}}

Awards and nominations

Notes

References

External links 
 

2010s American children's comedy television series
2011 American television series debuts
2016 American television series endings
American children's musical television series
Disney Channel original programming
English-language television shows
Television duos
Television series by It's a Laugh Productions
Television shows set in Miami